{{DISPLAYTITLE:C18H24O2}}
The molecular formula C18H24O2 may refer to:

 Alfatradiol
 Bolandione
 Dienolone
 ent-Estradiol
 Estradiol
 17α-Estradiol
 19-Nor-5-androstenedione